Jack H. Connelly (4 August 1918 – 10 August 2006) was an Australian rules footballer who played with St Kilda in the Victorian Football League (VFL).

Connelly, a forward, was St Kilda's leading goal-kicker in the 1943 VFL season, with 27 goals, despite not playing past round 11. He returned to his original club, Preston, in 1945.

References

1918 births
2006 deaths
Australian rules footballers from Victoria (Australia)
St Kilda Football Club players
Preston Football Club (VFA) players